The Family Man is a medical drama in three parts that aired on BBC One from 23 March to 6 April 2006, centered on the successful (fictional) Wishart Fertility Clinic which has recently celebrated its 2000th live birth. The patriarch of the clinic is Dr Patrick Stowe (played by Trevor Eve). The drama follows four couples facing a spectrum of fertility problems.

References

External links

2006 British television series debuts
2006 British television series endings
2000s British drama television series
BBC television dramas
2000s British medical television series
2000s British television miniseries
English-language television shows
Television shows set in the United Kingdom
BBC television miniseries